Kristina Kim (born September 4, 1989 in Kyzylorda, Kazakh SSR, Soviet Union) is a Russian taekwondo practitioner. At the 2012 Summer Olympics, she competed in the Women's 49 kg competition, but was defeated in the first round.

References

Russian female taekwondo practitioners
1989 births
Living people
Olympic taekwondo practitioners of Russia
Taekwondo practitioners at the 2012 Summer Olympics
Koryo-saram
Universiade medalists in taekwondo
Universiade bronze medalists for Russia
European Games competitors for Russia
Taekwondo practitioners at the 2015 European Games
European Taekwondo Championships medalists
Medalists at the 2009 Summer Universiade
21st-century Russian women